Quercus xylina is a species of oak in the family Fagaceae, native to western Mexico. It was first described by Michael J. F. Scheidweiler in 1837. It is classified in Quercus sect. Quercus.

References

xylina
Flora of Northwestern Mexico
Flora of Southwestern Mexico
Plants described in 1837